Tiospa Zina Tribal School is a tribal K-12 school in Agency Village, South Dakota. It is affiliated with the Bureau of Indian Education (BIE).

History
The school was the project of the chairperson of the area Indian tribe, a man named Rollin Ryan (he died in or before 1989).

It was established circa 1981, with an initial enrollment of 11. The area did not yet have a school prior to TZTS's opening. By 1994 the school had about 500 students. At that time there were plans to construct a replacement facility which would be designed in an eagle-like shape. By 2004 the facility had been built, with the cost being $21 million.

The school in 2003 made a Bureau of Indian Affairs-defined adequate progress level, but it did not do so in 2004.

References

External links
 Tiospa Zina Tribal School

High schools in South Dakota
Middle schools in South Dakota
Elementary schools in South Dakota
Native American K-12 schools
Education in Roberts County, South Dakota
1981 establishments in South Dakota
Educational institutions established in 1981